Hirendra Bhartu (born May 14, 1958) is a Canadian professional indoor and lawn bowler from Suva, Fiji. He has won nine Canadian national titles in Men's Singles and Pairs as well as Mixed Pairs.

Bowls career
Hirendra began his lawn bowling career at Nanaimo Lawn Bowling Club in 1995. In 2006, after honing his talent for indoor bowls at the Pacific Indoor Club in Vancouver, BC, he catapulted onto the international lawn bowling scene by soundly defeating his Canadian counterparts in all 4 of the Canadian PBA qualifiers in order to play in the World Bowls Tour.  This accomplishment allowed him to compete with some of the finest lawn bowlers in the world in 4 prestigious events; the Scottish International Masters in Perth Scotland, Potters World Indoor Singles, The Engage International Open. and the Welsh International 2006.

Hirendra Represented Canada at the 2008 World Outdoor Bowls Championship held in Christchurch, NZ.
Hirendra skipped the men's triples team to a bronze medal by defeating England. They lost to eventual winners Scotland in the semi-final.

Hirendra went on to represent Canada at the 2010 Commonwealth Games, Delhi as vice on the men's triples team. The team did not make the play-offs.

Hirendra is currently bowling as a member of Bowls BC out of the North Island Zone on Vancouver Island. In 2015 Hirendra won the BC Provincial Championship in Men's Pairs (4th win) and Mixed Pairs (5th win).

In 2022, he qualified to represent Canada at the 2022 World Bowls Indoor Championships. The event had been cancelled in 2020 and 2021 due to the COVID-19 pandemic.

References

External links
Worldbowls.co.uk
Bowlscanada.com

1958 births
Living people
Canadian male bowls players
Fijian emigrants to Canada
Sportspeople from Suva
Canadian people of Indo-Fijian descent
Bowls players at the 2010 Commonwealth Games
Commonwealth Games competitors for Canada